Sun En (孫恩; died April or May 402)  courtesy name Linxiu (灵秀), was a native of Langya (in modern Shandong) who rebelled against the Eastern Jin dynasty.

Life
A member of Sun Xiu's clan, he joined his uncle Sun Tai (孫泰), who was regarded as a magician member of the Way of the Five Pecks of Rice movement, sharing their revolutionary aspirations. When Sun Tai was put to death, Sun En took the lead himself. At the head of a considerable force Sun En captured Kuaiji (modern Hangzhou, Zhejiang province) and proclaimed himself Generalissimo of the East (征東將軍), giving to his followers the title of "Immortals" (長生人). After a long struggle, with alternating fortune, he found himself without resources and committed suicide by drowning himself in the sea. Although eventually the rebellion was put down by Liu Laozhi (and others), the rebellion caused massive devastation and major loss of life, including that of many civilians, to the point where whole cities were almost completely deserted.

See also
 List of rebellions in China#Eastern Jin dynasty
 Xie Daoyun

References

4th-century births
402 deaths
Jin dynasty (266–420) rebels
Generalissimos
Jin dynasty (266–420) people
Suicides by drowning in China
Suicides in the Jin dynasty (266–420)